Cali Iz Active is the fourth studio album by rap group Tha Dogg Pound and is also the name of the album's title track and lead single. It was released through Koch and Snoop Dogg's Doggystyle Records on June 27, 2006.

Besides Daz and Kurupt, the album also features Tha Dogg Pound family (Snoop Dogg, Soopafly, Nate Dogg, RBX, and Lady of Rage). Also appearing are David Banner, Ice Cube, Paul Wall and producers Battlecat, Fredwreck, Swizz Beatz and Jazze Pha.

Snoop Dogg has already used the Royal Cash sample in one of his earlier unreleased recordings with DJ Glaze of Foesum. It was titled "True To The Game" and DJ Glaze included it in his mixtape The Lost Tapez

Critical reception

Pedro Hernandez of RapReviews said that while the subject matter remains unchanged, he gave praise to the trio's camaraderie throughout the record, and the production and collaborations throughout the track listing from both West Coast and non-West Coast artists, saying that "Overall, Cali Iz Active is a dope West Coast album full of gangsta anthems that are funky enough to be enjoyed by all." AllMusic editor David Jeffries praised both the chemistry and reinvigorated lyricism of Daz and Kurupt, the production and varied guest list, concluding that "While it's a track or two too long, Cali Iz Active is arguably the strongest album from the crew and a West Coast fiend's dream come true." Christian Hoard from Rolling Stone said the record "sacrifices deep focus in favor of cameos from Diddy, Nate Dogg, Ice Cube and Paul Wall, but the party-hearty free-for-all feel is good enough, especially on "Keep It Gangsta" and the hooky, brawling Cube feature "It's All Hood."" The A.V. Clubs Nathan Rabin said, "For the first 10 tracks or so, Cali Iz Active qualifies as a surprisingly solid comeback effort, but the disc starts to drag well before it reaches the end of its 68 minutes. Tha Dogg Pound throws a laid-back gangsta party here, but part of being a good host is knowing when to call it a night." XXL writer Damien Scott was mixed about the album, praising the duo for staying lyrically consistent but was put off by the guest contributions from David Banner and Busta Rhymes and the "misogynistic tracks ("Drop Your Drawers" and "She Like Dat")" for lacking the "infectious flavor" that previous DPG efforts contained, concluding that "Aside from the failed reaches for broader acceptance, Daz and Kurupt still manage to corral enough gangsta shit to keep the Cali movement active." Andres Tardio from HipHopDX heavily panned the record for having "tired subject matter delivered in a tired fashion", criticizing both Daz and Kurupt for writing lyrical content that's unoriginal nor memorable, concluding that "[T]his album, instead of solidifying the crew, is simply going to go down as one with filler after filler. So, to answer the question...No, the group didn’t live up to the hype."

Commercial performance
Cali Iz Active debuted at number 28 on the US Billboard 200 chart, selling over 30,000 copies in its first week.

Track listing

Personnel

Dave Aaron - Mixing
David Banner - Primary Artist, Producer
Diddy - Primary Artist
Snoop Dogg - Primary Artist
Braddon Williams - Engineer
Leslie Braithwaite - Mixing
Oliver Brown - Vocals
Tha Dogg Pound - Primary Artist
Nate Dogg - Primary Artist
John Frye - Mixing
Ice Cube - Primary Artist
Rich Keller - Mixing
The Lady Of Rage - Primary Artist
Ryan Leslie - Producer
L.T. Moe - Composer, Producer
Tracy Lee Nelson - Vocals
RBX - Primary Artist
Rick Rock - Mixing, Producer
Soopafly - Mixing, Producer
Swizz Beatz - Producer
Paul Wall - Primary Artist

Charts

References

External links

Sales charts

Tha Dogg Pound albums
2006 albums
Albums produced by Bangladesh (record producer)
Albums produced by Battlecat (producer)
Albums produced by David Banner
Albums produced by Jazze Pha
Albums produced by Ryan Leslie
Albums produced by Soopafly
Albums produced by Swizz Beatz
E1 Music albums
Gangsta rap albums by American artists
Albums produced by 1500 or Nothin'